Jozef Banáš (born 27 September 1948) is a Slovak novelist, journalist, diplomat and politician.

Professional career
 1972 - graduated at the University of Economics in Bratislava with major in foreign trade
 1973-1976 - business consultant at Chirana Export Piešťany
 1977-1992 - Ministry of Foreign Affairs, Prague
 1983-1988 - embassy in Berlin, NDR, press attaché
 1990-1992 - embassy in Wien, deputy chief of mission
 1992 - Raiffeisenleasing Wien
 1993-1994 - Tatraleasing Bratislava, chief executive officer
 1994-2001 - Slovak International Tabak, industrial politics management

Works 
 1978 – Nebráňme vtákom lietať (Don't stop the birds from flying), TV staging, scenario
 1979 – Čisté vody (Clear waters), TV staging
 1982 – Mimoriadny rýchlik (Extraordinary express), TV staging, scenario
 1983 – Kirchhoffov zákon (Kirchoff's Law), TV staging, scenario
 1985 – Začiatok sezóny (Start of the season), movie scenario
 1990 – Tréning na štátnika (Training for statesman), theatre comedy
 1996 – No Comment, theatre comedy
 2001 – Lepší ako včera (Better than yesterday), book of short stories
 2006 – Politicum tremens (co-author Bohumil Hanzel), humorous book about National Council of Slovakia
 2007 – Idioti v politike (Idiots in politics), satiric book about politics
 2007 – Delírium P. (Delirium P.), theatre comedy
 2008 – Zóna nadšenia (Zone of enthusiasm), political thriller 
 2009 – Zastavte Dubčeka! (Stop Dubček !), novel
 2010 – Deň do večnosti (A day to eternity), poetry collection
 2010Kód 9 (Code 9), novel
 2011 – Sezóna potkanov (Rat season), novel
 2013 – Kód 1 (Code 1), novel
 2015 – Dementi (Morons), novel about Banáš's readers
 2020 - Nádherná Smrť v Altaji ("Amazing Death in Altay mountains"), novel

Besides his literal ventures, he is known as a political journalist and essayist. His essays and thoughts gained international acclaim.

Political career 
 1976 - entered Communist Party of Czechoslovakia (KSČ)
 2001-2002 - general secretary of the Aliancia nového občana (ANO) party
 2002-2006 - elected deputy of National Council as ANO candidate. He was the vice-chairman of Committee on European Integration, member of Safety and Defence and Stable delegation committee of National Council of Slovakia at the parliamentary assembly of European Council, and member of the Foreign affairs committee of National Council and leader of stable delegation of National Council at the parliamentary assembly of NATO.
 2003 - vice-chairman of The Parliamentary assembly of the European Council
 2004 - after he didn't become the leader as a candidate for ANO in the European Parliament elections, he announced that he's leaving ANO and will become an independent deputy in the National Council
 2004 - entered the deputies club of The Slovak Democratic and Christian Union party (SDKÚ)
 2004 - entered SDKÚ
 11.11.2004 - elected in Venice as a vice-chairman of The NATO Parliamentary assembly, making him the first Slovak elected in this position

Personal life 
He is married and has two daughters. His younger daughter, Adela Vinczeová, is a prominent moderator and entertainer in Slovakia.

References
 Slaboch aj veľký politik. Názory na symbol Pražskej jari sa líšia (in Slovak)
 Josef Banáš at the Berlin International Literature Festival 2010

1948 births
Living people
Writers from Bratislava
Slovak journalists
Diplomats from Bratislava
Members of the National Council (Slovakia) 2002-2006
Politicians from Bratislava
Slovak Democratic and Christian Union – Democratic Party politicians